Raúl Navarro (October 6, 1921 – December 1999) was a Cuban outfielder in the Negro leagues in the 1940s.

A native of Limonar, Cuba, Navarro played for the Cincinnati Clowns in 1945. He also played several seasons in the Mexican League through the mid-1950s. Navarro died in 1999 at age 78.

References

External links
 and Seamheads
 Raymond 'Raul' Navarro at Negro League Baseball Players Association

1921 births
1999 deaths
Date of death missing
Place of death missing
Cincinnati Clowns players
Baseball outfielders
Cuban baseball players
People from Matanzas Province
Alijadores de Tampico players
Azules de Veracruz players
Tuneros de San Luis Potosí players
Diablos Rojos del México players
Saraperos de Saltillo players
Cuban expatriates in the United States